Meraj Uddin Mollah (–9 May 2021) was a Bangladesh Awami League politician and the Member of Parliament of Rajshahi-3.

Career
Mollah was elected to parliament from Rajshahi-3 as a Bangladesh Awami League candidate in 2008. In 2011, he served as the President of the Rajshahi District unit of Bangladesh Awami League. His son was arrested for narcotics possession in 2013.

References

Awami League politicians
9th Jatiya Sangsad members
Year of birth missing
2021 deaths
People of the Bangladesh Liberation War
Deaths from the COVID-19 pandemic in Bangladesh
1940s births
People from Rajshahi District